Henry Gordon Wilson (born 21 March 1944) is a Scottish retired amateur footballer who played in the Scottish League for Queen's Park as a goalkeeper. He was capped by Scotland at amateur level. Wilson also played rugby union.

References 

1944 births
Living people
Scottish footballers
Scottish Football League players
Queen's Park F.C. players
Association football goalkeepers
Scotland amateur international footballers
Hawick Royal Albert F.C. players
Footballers from Glasgow
Scottish rugby union players
Melrose RFC players
Selkirk RFC players
Edinburgh Wanderers RFC players
Rugby union players from Glasgow